Zlatko Bolić (Serbian Cyrillic: Златко Болић; born February 6, 1974) is a Serbian professional basketball executive and former player. He currently serves as the general secretary of the Basketball Federation of Serbia.

He was one of the best shooters of the YUBA League.

Professional career
Bolić played with Vlade Divac, Igor Rakočević and Vladimir Radmanović in 1999, the same year that Crvena zvezda was in the Euroleague group stage.

National team career 
Bolić was a member of the Yugoslavia national cadet team at the 1991 European Championship for Cadets in Greece. Over seven tournament games, he averaged 18.0 points per game. He was the top scorer of Yugoslavia at the tournament.

Bolić was a member of the Yugoslavia national under-22 team (representing FR Yugoslavia) that won the bronze medal at the 1996 European Championship for Men 22 and Under in Turkey. Over seven tournament games, he averaged 4.1 points per game.

Post-playing career
From 2011 to 2019, Bolić was a little league coach for a basketball club named after his children (Dunja and Luka).

On 26 November 2019, Bolić was appointed as a Secretary-General for the Basketball Federation of Serbia.

See also 
 List of KK Crvena zvezda players with 100 games played

References

External links
 Zlatko Bolić at abaliga.com
 Zlatko Bolić at euroleague.com
 Zlatko Bolić at eurobasket.com
 Zlatko Bolić at draftexpress.com

1974 births
Living people
ABA League players
A.E.L. 1964 B.C. players
Basketball League of Serbia players
KK Beopetrol/Atlas Beograd players
KK Crvena zvezda players
KK Hemofarm players
KK Metalac Valjevo players
KK Vojvodina players
KK Radnički Novi Sad players
KK Vojvodina Srbijagas players
Kecskeméti TE (basketball) players
Serbian basketball executives and administrators
Serbian men's basketball players
Serbian men's basketball coaches
Serbian expatriate basketball people in France
Serbian expatriate basketball people in Greece
Serbian expatriate basketball people in Hungary
Basketball players from Novi Sad
Shooting guards
SIG Basket players